Darren Coleman (born  1973) is an Australian professional rugby union coach. He is currently head coach of the New South Wales Waratahs.

Family and early life
Coleman grew up in Kempsey on the Mid North Coast of New South Wales, where he played rugby for the Kempsey Cannonballs team, before moving south to play in the Sydney club rugby competition.

His younger brother Scott Coleman also became a professional rugby coach, appointed to Italian club Benevento in 2013.

Rugby career
While attending Southern Cross University in the late 1990s Coleman played for the University Gold Rats alongside Justin Harrison. Coleman played as a fly-half in Sydney's club rugby competition from 1995 to 2000 for Eastern Suburbs, Newcastle Wildfires, and Northern Suburbs. He was a rugby development officer in Newcastle.

Coleman combined playing with coaching in the early part of his career. While playing for Northern Suburbs, he was appointed as head coach of the NSW Waratahs Academy in 1998, and then as a skills coach to the Waratahs for the 2000 Super 12 season. In late 2000 he left Australia to take up contract stints as a player-coach with Irish club Waterpark, Italian Serie A team Benevento[it] and the Calgary Saints and Calgary Mavericks in Canada.

Coaching
Coleman came back to Australia and joined the Penrith Emus as the head coach for the 2005 Shute Shield season. He then returned to Northern Suburbs as head coach for 2006 and 2007. Coleman was also assistant coach to the Central Coast Rays in the Australian Rugby Championship in 2007. He was appointed to professional Italian club L'Aquila for the 2007–08 season. guiding them to a promotion play-off for the Serie A Division.

He joined the Brumbies as head coach of the Brumbies Academy for the 2009 season. Brumbies head coach Andy Friend nominated Coleman as the Brumbies attack coach for the 2011 Super Rugby season, but the appointment was vetoed by the administration. He left for Japan to coach Toyota Industries Shuttles, where he guided the team to gain promotion to the Top League for the 2013–14 season.

On returning to Australia again, Coleman was coaching director of Eastern Suburbs from 2014 to 2016. He was appointed head coach of NSW Country Eagles in 2014, and head coach of Sydney club Warringah in 2017. Coleman won the Shute Shield premiership with Warringah in 2017. He was appointed head coach of Gordon in 2018, winning the Shute Shield with that club in 2020.

Coleman was announced as the head coach of Major League Rugby team LA Giltinis in the United States for their inaugural season in 2021. The Giltinis won the Western Conference and MLR Championship that year, before Coleman returned to Sydney to coach the New South Wales Waratahs for the 2022 season of Super Rugby.

Honours

LA Giltinis
Major League Rugby
 Championship winner: 2021
 Western Conference champion: 2021

NSW Country Eagles
National Rugby Championship
 Runner-up: 2014, 2016
 Minor premier: 2016

Central Coast Rays
Australian Rugby Championship
 Winner (assistant coach): 2007

Warringah
Australian Club Championship
 Winner: 2018
Shute Shield
 Winner: 2017
 Runner-up: 2018

Gordon
Shute Shield
 Winner: 2020
 Minor premier: 2020

References

Living people
Australian rugby union coaches
Australian rugby union players
Rugby union fly-halves
1973 births